Marian Ethel Mercer (November 26, 1935 – April 27, 2011) was an American actress and singer.

Career

Born in Akron, Ohio, Mercer was the daughter of Samuel and Nellie Mercer. She graduated from the University of Michigan, then spent several seasons working in summer stock. She made her Broadway debut in the chorus of the short-lived musical, Greenwillow in 1960.

She drew critical notice for her performance in New Faces of 1962, and won the Tony Award for Best Featured Actress in a Musical, the Drama Desk Award for Outstanding Performance, and the Theatre World Award for her performance as Marge MacDougall in Promises, Promises (1968). Additional theatre credits include Hay Fever and the short-lived 1978 revival of Stop the World – I Want to Get Off with Sammy Davis, Jr. In 1979, she starred as Deirdre in Bosoms and Neglect.

Mercer was a regular on television, appearing in The Dom DeLuise Show, The Wacky World of Jonathan Winters, The Sandy Duncan Show, A Touch of Grace (starring Shirley Booth), The Andy Williams Show, and the sitcom It's a Living, in which she played piquant restaurant hostess Nancy Beebe Miller. (Mercer was one of four members of the cast who lasted through the series' network and syndicated runs; the others were Gail Edwards, Paul Kreppel, and Barrie Youngfellow). She had recurring roles on Mary Hartman, Mary Hartman; its sequel, Forever Fernwood; St. Elsewhere; and Empty Nest.

She made guest appearances on such shows as Love, American Style; Archie Bunker's Place; Mama's Family; Benson; The Golden Girls; Murder, She Wrote; Touched by an Angel; and Suddenly Susan, among many others. She had featured roles in the television films The Cracker Factory (1979), which starred Natalie Wood, and Murder in Three Acts (1986), starring Peter Ustinov and Tony Curtis. Her big screen credits include John and Mary (1969); Oh, God! Book II (1980); and 9 to 5 (1980), where she played Missy Hart.

Marian had been reunited with two former co-stars of Mary Hartman, Mary Hartman (in which she played Wanda Rittenhouse Jeeter) in two separate projects. She was reunited first with Dabney Coleman (he had played Merle Jeeter) in the film 9 to 5; and then with Louise Lasser (who played Mary Hartman) on It's a Living.

Death
Mercer was a resident of the Motion Picture & Television Country House and Hospital in Woodland Hills, California where she resided until her death on April 27, 2011 from Alzheimer's disease in Newbury Park, California at the age of 75.

Filmography

Film

Television

References

External links
 
 
 

1935 births
2011 deaths
Actresses from Akron, Ohio
American stage actresses
American musical theatre actresses
American television actresses
Drama Desk Award winners
Musicians from Akron, Ohio
Theatre World Award winners
Tony Award winners
University of Michigan alumni
Deaths from Alzheimer's disease
Deaths from dementia in California
People from Woodland Hills, Los Angeles
21st-century American women